The Larissa Football Clubs Association or the LFCA (Ένωση Ποδοσφαιρικών Σωματείων Λάρισας, ΕΠΣΛ = Enosi Podosfairikon Somateion Larissas, EPSL) is a football (soccer) organization in the Larissa prefecture that is part of the Greek Football Federation. LFCA is responsible for organizing the prefectural football (soccer) championships in four divisions (named A, A1 , B and C ) and the LFCA Cup. LFCA also organizes championship and cup competitions for youth and development teams.The LFCA Championship (winner of LFCA A Division) is promoted to the Third National Division, while the LFCA Cup winner enters the Greek Football Amateur Cup.

History

Larissa FCA was founded in 1960 after the split from the Thessaly Football Clubs Association which now serves only for Magnesia (with headquarters in Volos).

LFCA Championship System

The Larissa FCA League System since 2001, when A1 Division was introduced, consists of four divisions, namely Alpha Division ,  the top-level football league in Larissa (fourth level in Greek Football), the Alpha 1 Division, second tier in the pyramid, the Beta Division usually with three Groups and constituting the third tier of the league system and finally the Gamma Division.

Champions 
The Larissa Football Clubs Association champions are listed as below:

 
Note: First division was divided in 2 or even 3 groups during the 1974–75 and 1985–86 seasons. Classification was decided by draw due to equal group rankings in some rare cases.

Performance by club 
Note: Bold indicates clubs currently playing in the top division of Larissa Football Clubs Association.

LFA Cup

Finals

Super Cup

Finals

Performance by club

Koukoulitsios-Mousiaris tournament 
The tournament started in 1994 in commemoration of football players Dimitrios Koukoulitsios and Dimitrios Mousiaris who died tragically in a car accident in 1979. It is normally held every September before the opening of the season.

Finals
2009: Voukefalas - Larisaikos 3-1 2011: Olympos Larissa - Iraklis Larissa 2-0

Teams in national divisions

For the 2022–23 season, five teams participate in national divisions:

Super League 2 (second tier):
AEL
Apollon Larissa
Iraklis Larissa
Gamma Ethniki (third tier):
Dotieas Agias
PO Elassona

See also
Thessaly Football Clubs Association

Reference section

External links

Larissa (regional unit)
Association football governing bodies in Greece